Sinar Indonesia Baru (New Rays of Indonesia, also known by its abbreviation SIB) is an Indonesian daily newspaper published in Medan, North Sumatra. The newspaper was founded on 9 May 1970 by GM Panggabean, a former contributor at Waspada; it claims itself as the only newspaper founded by a Bataknese. Besides printed edition, Sinar Indonesia Baru also maintain its online presence.

In a 2011 writing, Sinar Indonesia Baru was among the largest circulated daily newspaper in Indonesia, with the circulation of about 150,000.

References

External links 
 Official website

Newspapers published in Medan
Publications established in 1970
1970 establishments in Indonesia